Waterloo is a town in Grant and Smithfield townships, DeKalb County, Indiana, United States. The population was 2,242 at the 2010 census.

History
Waterloo was laid out in 1856 when the railroad was extended to that point. It was likely named after Waterloo, in Belgium.

The Waterloo Community Mausoleum was added to the National Register of Historic Places in 2014.

Geography

A nearly complete mastodon skeleton discovered near Waterloo in 1888 is displayed at the Carnegie Museum of Natural History in Pittsburgh.

Demographics

2010 census
As of the census of 2010, there were 2,242 people, 809 households, and 577 families living in the town. The racial makeup of the town was 95.3% White, 0.5% African American, 0.1% Native American, 1.7% from other races, and 2.4% from two or more races. Hispanic or Latino of any race were 3.8% of the population.

There were 809 households, of which 42.5% had children under the age of 18 living with them, 48.1% were married couples living together, 16.8% had a female householder with no husband present, 6.4% had a male householder with no wife present, and 28.7% were non-families. 23.4% of all households were made up of individuals, and 7.5% had someone living alone who was 65 years of age or older. The average household size was 2.77 and the average family size was 3.19.

The median age in the town was 31.5 years. 30% of residents were under the age of 18; 10.1% were between the ages of 18 and 24; 29.1% were from 25 to 44; 22.9% were from 45 to 64; and 8% were 65 years of age or older. The gender makeup of the town was 50.6% male and 49.4% female.

2000 census
As of the census of 2000, there were 2,200 people, 832 households, and 584 families living in the town. The racial makeup of the town was 95.50% White, 0.23% African American, 0.45% Native American, 0.18% Asian, 2.82% from other races, and 0.82% from two or more races. Hispanic or Latino of any race were 3.68% of the population.

There were 832 households, out of which 39.1% had children under the age of 18 living with them, 52.3% were married couples living together, 11.8% had a female householder with no husband present, and 29.7% were non-families. 23.8% of all households were made up of individuals, and 8.4% had someone living alone who was 65 years of age or older.  The average household size was 2.64 and the average family size was 3.10.

In the town, the population was spread out, with 30.4% under the age of 18, 9.5% from 18 to 24, 33.0% from 25 to 44, 18.8% from 45 to 64, and 8.4% who were 65 years of age or older.  The median age was 31 years. For every 100 females, there were 106.4 males.  For every 100 females age 18 and over, there were 100.8 males.

The median income for a household in the town was $39,831, and the median income for a family was $45,625. Males had a median income of $35,035 versus $24,635 for females. The per capita income for the town was $16,248.  About 7.9% of families and 12.4% of the population were below the poverty line, including 16.8% of those under age 18 and 17.8% of those age 65 or over.

Education 
Waterloo lies in the Dekalb County Central United School District.  Public schools serving Waterloo are:
Waterloo Elementary School
DeKalb Middle School
DeKalb High School

The town is served by the Waterloo-Grant Township Public Library, one of four public libraries in Dekalb County.

Rail transportation

Waterloo is located on the old Lake Shore and Michigan Southern Railway, and is now on the Norfolk Southern Railway.  The town is now served daily by two Amtrak trains: the Capitol Limited and the Lake Shore Limited.

In October 2010, the Town of Waterloo received a $1.8 million grant from the federal government to build a longer platform just east of the current station, bringing it up to ADA standards, and add a canopy, lighting, and interactive signage. Ultimately, the platform was not built, but the grant was used to install the lighting and electronic signage, as well as a parking lot, in 2016. The previous rail depot, which was restored in 2010, was moved closer to the existing platform and reopened to Amtrak passengers.

Media
WINT-TV, Channel 15, which became WANE-TV, Fort Wayne, in 1956, began broadcasting from studios in Waterloo in 1954.

References

External links

 Waterloo Chamber of Commerce
 DeKalb County Central United School District
 VIDEO: Waterloo, Indiana (1937)

Towns in DeKalb County, Indiana
Towns in Indiana
Populated places established in 1856
1856 establishments in Indiana